The 1991 Supercopa Libertadores was the fourth season of the Supercopa Libertadores, a club football tournament for past Copa Libertadores winners. The tournament was won by Cruzeiro, who beat River Plate 3–2 on aggregate in the final.

As the new reigning Copa Libertadores champions, Chilean side Colo-Colo were admitted into the competition.

Former Copa Libertadores winners Atlético Nacional did not take part.

Qualified teams
Up until the middle of 1991, 15 teams had won the Copa Libertadores at least once since its inaugural season in 1960; however, only 14 teams participated as Atlético Nacional declined to play in the tournament.

Bracket

First round
Teams from the same nation could not be drawn against one another. Olimpia, as the title holders, entered the competition at the quarterfinal stage. Independiente also advanced to that same stage after the initial draw.

|}

Quarterfinals

|}

Semi-finals

|}

Final

|}

See also
1991 Copa Libertadores

External links
RSSSF

Supercopa Libertadores
2